Lucas Bouk is an American opera singer and actor from Rochester, New York. He came out in 2018 as a trans man, and played his first role as an openly trans man in a jazz opera character written with him in mind. A play about his transitioning was staged in 2018, and revived in 2019. In June 2019, he became the first openly transgender opera singer in a featured role written for a transgender singer in Stonewall.

Education and personal life 
Lucas Bouk grew up in Rochester, New York in a conservative environment, with "misunderstanding, misattunement, and pain" from his conflicted gender identity. He married his high school sweetheart when they were both 21.

Bouk studied at the Cincinnati Conservatory of Music. After graduate school Bouk and his husband had a child together. The pregnancy and birth were extremely difficult for Bouk: "I felt drowned and suffocated by cisgendered parenting expectations. My son's existence wasn't the problem, it was all the social norms and expectations surrounding the idea of being a mother that plagued me with anxiety and anger." Bouk initially thought his anger towards casual sexual harassment and the word "mother" was due to being a "staunch feminist"; later the family would stop celebrating gendered holidays.

In 2014, Bouk quit his job, and hoping to boost his career and find himself, moved to Manhattan. Around the same time, in order to feel more comfortable in his body, he started doing yoga and took dance classes. In September 2017 Bouk began to self-identify as a transgender man. He came out to his husband, who was supportive. Bouk wears a tuxedo for concert singing rather than a traditional gown.

In October 2018 Bouk took part in Bumble's worldwide campaign about New Yorkers "discussing their lives and loves".

Career 
Before coming out, Bouk sang a series of cabaret evenings featuring famous songs for female characters, by Stephen Sondheim, Kurt Weill, Jason Robert Brown, George Gershwin, Cole Porter, and Rodgers & Hammerstein, to "become comfortable inhabiting female characters onstage that I might be able to feel more confident in my body in my actual life". Later he focused on female opera characters, “trapped by circumstance, society and gender”.

In May 2018, as part of New York's 2018 Opera Fest, he came out publicly as a trans man in a new opera, Tabula Rasa, a jazz-inspired work presented by the Cantanti Project, from gay composer Felix Jarrar and librettist Brittany Goodwin. The role of dadaist Tristan Tzara was created for Bouk so he could "publicly express [his] new gender identity". It was Bouk's first male role since coming out.

In November 2018, Bouk and director Bea Goodwin presented “Mr. Liz Cabaret: Living in the In Between“, a coming of age story and cabaret about Bouk’s coming out process, at Alchemical Studio Lab. For the one-man show they used his journal entries, photos, paintings, and memories. It includes painful episodes of being misgendered. The show returned in February 2019 at New York City’s The Tank.

Following his one-man show, he did the transgender-themed “As One” at Alamo City Opera. “As One” is a newer opera which has already been performed around the world, telling the story with two characters, Hannah Before and Hannah After, who share insights into the transitioning experience. Bouk portrayed Hannah After.

He then did Giacomo Puccini’s “Suor Angelica” and “Gianni Schicchi,” at St. Petersburg Opera. In May/June 2019 he reprised his role in “As One” at Merkin Concert Hall for American Opera Projects and New York City Opera.

In June 2019, Bouk played a featured character in Stonewall, an opera about the 1969 Stonewall riots which had its world premiere in conjunction with Stonewall 50 – WorldPride NYC 2019. Stonewall was commissioned by New York City Opera (NYCO), and features music by Iain Bell, a libretto by Mark Campbell, and direction by Leonard Foglia. Stonewall is the first opera to feature a transgender character written for a transgender singer. Bouk portrays Sarah, a trans woman celebrating the first anniversary of her transitioning.

See also 

 Castrato
 Cross-gender acting
 Feminist views on transgender topics
 List of historical opera characters
 List of lesbian, gay, bisexual, or transgender firsts by year
 Non-binary gender
 Transgender youth
 Transgender history
 Transgender rights in the United States

References 

Living people
American opera singers
American male musical theatre actors
People from Rochester, New York
Transgender male musicians
American LGBT singers
Year of birth missing (living people)
University of Cincinnati – College-Conservatory of Music alumni
21st-century American opera singers
Transgender male actors
American LGBT actors
Transgender singers